Ingė Lukšaitė (born 1940) is a Lithuanian cultural historian and university professor. She specializes in the history of the Reformation in Lithuania. She worked at the Lithuanian Institute of History for over four decades.

Biography
Lukšaitė was born on 2 February 1940 in Kaunas to the family of banker  and cultural historian Meilė Lukšienė. She studied at the National M. K. Čiurlionis School of Art before enrolling at Vilnius University to study history. She graduated in 1962 and worked as a teacher in Trakų Vokė until 1964 when she became an aspirant (doctoral student) at the Lithuanian Institute of History. 

She worked at the Lithuanian Institute of History from 1967 to her retirement in 2009. She also lectured at the Vilnius Academy of Arts (1985–1990), Vytautas Magnus University (1995–2002), and Vytautas Magnus University (2001–2007).

Works
In total, Lukšaitė has published more than 180 works – books, academic articles, and other publications. Her bibliography was compiled and published in 2010.

In 1971, she defended her thesis on the Lithuanian language during the Reformation in the 17th century and became a Candidate of Sciences. The thesis was published as a separate book in 1970. 

In 2000, she defended her monograph on the Reformation in the Grand Duchy of Lithuania and Lithuania Minor in the 16th and 17th centuries and was awarded Dr. habil. The monograph was translated to German in 2017. A shortened Lithuanian version for the general public was also published in 2017. In this work, Lukšienė did not follow Polish historiography and was the first to separate the Reformation in the Grand Duchy of Lithuania from the Reformation in Poland and link it to the Reformetion in Lithuania Minor.

At the Lithuanian Institute of History, she headed the program on publishing historical Lithuanian texts in 1998–2009. She prepared several publications of historical sources, including an anthology of texts on the education in Lithuania in the 13th to 16th centuries (with others; 1994), selected works of Andreas Volanus (with Marcelinas Ročka; 1996), Deliciae Prussicae by Matthäus Prätorius (with others; 4 volumes in 1999–2011), and documents on the visitation of Lutheran churches in Klaipėda in 1676–1685 (2009).

Lukšaitė served on the editorial board of academic journals Lietuvos istorijos metraštis, Knygotyra, and book series Senoji lietuvių literatūra.

Awards
Lukšienė received the following awards:
 1997: Order of the Lithuanian Grand Duke Gediminas (Knight's Cross)
 1999: 
 2002: 
 2017:

References

1940 births
Living people
20th-century Lithuanian historians
21st-century Lithuanian historians
Women historians
Cultural historians
Reformation historians
Vilnius University alumni
Academic staff of the Vilnius Academy of Arts
Academic staff of Vytautas Magnus University
Academic staff of Klaipėda University
Recipients of the Order of the Lithuanian Grand Duke Gediminas